Carlos Estanislao "Tano" Goya (born 1 June 1988) is an Argentine professional golfer.

Professional career
After turning professional in 2007, Goya won the Tour de las Americas qualifying school by nine shots, and followed that with victory in the first event of the 2008 season, the Challenge Tour co-sanctioned Center Open, and third place in the Argentine Open. He went on to finish top of the Order of Merit that year.

That first win also gave Goya Challenge Tour membership, and he finished the season by winning the Apulia San Domenico Grand Final, which lifted him to fifth in that tours final standings, gaining exemption to the full European Tour for 2009. He won the TPG Tour Order of Merit in 2008.

In March 2009, in only his sixth start on the European Tour, Goya won the Madeira Islands Open BPI – Portugal, earning him full exemption on the tour until the end of 2010. Goya couldn't follow up his European Tour win and won a Challenge Tour event in 2017.

In 2014, Goya won the Dimension Data Pro-Am on the Sunshine Tour.

Personal life
In 2015, he married former professional golfer Henni Zuël; they divorced in 2018.

Professional wins (7)

European Tour wins (1)

Sunshine Tour wins (1)

Challenge Tour wins (3)

1Co-sanctioned by the Tour de las Américas and the TPG Tour

Challenge Tour playoff record (1–0)

Tour de las Américas wins (1)

1Co-sanctioned by the Challenge Tour and the TPG Tour

TPG Tour wins (3)

1Co-sanctioned by the Challenge Tour and the Tour de las Américas

Other wins (1)
2008 DeVicenzo Shootout (Argentina)

Results in major championships

CUT = missed the half-way cut
"T" indicates a tie for a place

Results in World Golf Championships

Team appearances
Amateur
 Eisenhower Trophy (representing Argentina): 2006
 Vigil Cup (Argentine): 2007 (team and individual winner)

Professional
 World Cup (representing Argentina): 2009

See also
2008 Challenge Tour graduates
2012 European Tour Qualifying School graduates
2013 European Tour Qualifying School graduates
2022 Korn Ferry Tour Finals graduates

References

External links

Argentine male golfers
PGA Tour Latinoamérica golfers
European Tour golfers
PGA Tour golfers
Korn Ferry Tour graduates
Golfers at the 2019 Pan American Games
Pan American Games competitors for Argentina
Sportspeople from Córdoba Province, Argentina
1988 births
Living people